The Cooperage Football Ground is a football stadium located in Nariman Point, Mumbai, India. It is currently home to multiple Mumbai Football League clubs.

The Western India Football Association has operated from the Cooperage Ground since 1969, and the Mumbai District Football Association holds a small office. It was a venue for one of India's premier national leagues, the I-League. Kenkre is currently using the stadium as their home ground since their inception in 2000.

History

Cooperage Ground was the primary venue of the Rovers Cup, the third oldest football tournament in India after Durand and Trades Cup. The stadium was occupied by the British Indian Army during the World War I. In April 2011, plans were announced for the Cooperage Football Ground to be renovated when FIFA announced that they would give the Western India Football Association US$2 million in order to renovate that stadium. On 12 June 2011, it was announced in the Bombay High Court that the West India Football Association would be given the right to renovate the Cooperage Ground.

See also
 List of football stadiums in India

References

External links
 Stadium picture
 Aerial stadium picture

 Stadium pictures

Football venues in Maharashtra
Sports venues in Mumbai
Mumbai FC
Air India FC
1933 establishments in India
Sports venues completed in 1933
20th-century architecture in India